Bill Norgrave (born 15 April 1947) is a British gymnast. He competed in seven events at the 1972 Summer Olympics.

References

1947 births
Living people
British male artistic gymnasts
Olympic gymnasts of Great Britain
Gymnasts at the 1972 Summer Olympics
Place of birth missing (living people)